Meredyth (Mere) Smith is an American television script-writer who wrote a number of episodes of the series Angel. She was also the executive story editor and script coordinator for 66 episodes from 1999 to 2003.

More recently, she wrote the episodes "Heroes of the Republic" and "Deus Impeditio Esuritori Nullus" for the HBO series Rome, as well as episodes of Burn Notice and The Nine Lives of Chloe King.

Smith attended Brown University, at which she contributed often to its theatre productions. She is originally from Houston, Texas.

Angel episodes

2.04 "Untouched"
2.11 "Redefinition"
2.12 "Blood Money"
2.20 "Over the Rainbow"
3.05 "Fredless"
3.11 "Birthday"
3.15 "Loyalty"
4.02 "Ground State"
4.09 "Long Day's Journey"
4.12 "Calvary"
4.15 "Orpheus"

External links

Evil Gal Productions

Television producers from Texas
American women television producers
American television writers
Brown University alumni
Living people
People from Houston
American women television writers
Year of birth missing (living people)
Screenwriters from Texas